JS Kirishima (DDG-174) is a  guided missile destroyer in the Japan Maritime Self-Defense Force (JMSDF). Kirishima was named for Mount Kirishima. She was laid down by Mitsubishi Heavy Industries in Nagasaki, Nagasaki on 7 April 1992, and was launched on 19 August 1993.

It was not until 16 March 1995 that she was commissioned. She is based at the JMSDF base in Yokosuka, Kanagawa, and as of 2014, is the flagship of Rear Admiral Hidetoshi Iwasaki.

History
In 2003 the Kirishima was deployed to the Indian Ocean as logistical support for US forces engaged in the War on Terror. This prompted some opposition including protests and boatloads of protesters attempting to block the ship from leaving its harbor at Yokosuka. It was later replaced in the deployment by the destroyer .

Kirishima underwent modification at Nagasaki to add the Aegis Ballistic Missile Defense System (BMD) capability to its weapons suite.

This ship was one of several in the JMSDF fleet participating in disaster relief after the 2011 Tōhoku earthquake and tsunami.

The ship was also deployed in preparation for North Korea's launch of Kwangmyŏngsŏng-3 in March 2012.

From 26 June to 1 August 2014, Kirishima participated in RIMPAC alongside . In November, it participated in the Keen Sword 15 exercises with the US.

Gallery

References

External links
GlobalSecurity.org; JMSDF DDG Kongo Class

Kongō-class destroyers
1993 ships
Ships built by Mitsubishi Heavy Industries